Çevik is a Turkish name and may refer to:

Given name
 Çevik Bir (born 1939), Turkish general

Surname
 Hakan Çevik (born 1976), Turkish Paralympic rifle shooter
 İlayda Çevik (born 1994), Turkish actress
 Okan Çevik (born 1966), Turkish basketball coach
 Özgür Çevik (born 1981), Turkish singer
 Ramazan Çevik (born 1992), Turkish-Belgian footballer 
 Suzan Çevik (born 1977), Turkish female Paralympic pistol shooter
 Tolga Çevik (born 1974), Turkish actor
 Yaşar Halit Çevik (born 1955), Turkish diplomat
 Zafer Çevik (born 1984), Turkish footballer

Places
 Çevik, Taşköprü, a village in Turkey

Turkish-language surnames
Turkish masculine given names